Rejang is a Unicode block containing characters used prior to the introduction of Islam for writing the Rejang dialects Musi, Kebanagun, Pesisir, and Rawas on the island of Sumatra.

History
The following Unicode-related documents record the purpose and process of defining specific characters in the Rejang block:

References 

Unicode blocks